If They Knew is the debut album by Australian singer and DJ Kaz James. It was released in Australia and New Zealand in October 2008.

James spent over a year working on the material for If They Knew. He stated in an interview that he recorded and mixed the tracks in the UK, Australia and Los Angeles before putting the finishing touches on the music in New York City. He described the music as "not about dance music so much as it's about music that people can dance to."

Track listing
Australian Edition
 "We Hold On" - 3:31
 "Still Thinking About You" - 3:42
 "Can't Hold Back" (featuring Macy Gray) - 2:32
 "Hollywood" - 2:44
 "You My Friend" - 3:51
 "Cool Like You" (featuring The Last Goodnight) - 4:03
 "Breathe" (featuring Stu Stone) - 3:22
 "All Fall Down" (featuring DJ Lethal) - 3:35
 "Subwoofers" (featuring Stu Stone) - 3:32
 "Star" - 3:15
 "I Did It Again" - 3:21

iTunes Bonus Track
12. "We Hold On" (Dave Spoon Remix) - 7:02

Charts

Release history

References

2008 debut albums
Kaz James albums
Sony Music Australia albums